Corinth is an unincorporated community in Sumner County, Tennessee, United States.

References

Unincorporated communities in Sumner County, Tennessee
Unincorporated communities in Tennessee